Lionepha is a genus of ground beetles in the family Carabidae. There are about 11 described species in Lionepha. Members of the genus are found in western North America from Alaska in the north, south to southern California and east to Colorado. The genus is morphologically similar to Bembidion, however they are genetically quite distinct.

Species
There are currently 11 described species in Lionepha divided into two groups:

L. erasa group:
 Lionepha australerasa 
Lionepha casta (Casey, 1918)
 Lionepha disjuncta (Lindroth, 1963)
 Lionepha erasa (LeConte, 1859)
Lionepha kavanaughi 
Lionepha lindrothi 
Lionepha probata 
L. osculans group:

 Lionepha osculans (Casey, 1918)
 Lionepha pseudoerasa (Lindroth, 1963)
 Lionepha sequoiae (Lindroth, 1963)
Lionepha tuulukwa

Synonyms 
The following is a list of selected synonyms:

Bembidion brumale  is a synonym of Lionepha casta.

Lionepha erasa has multiple junior synonyms:

 Lionepha chintimini (Erwin & Kavanaugh, 1981)
 Lionepha lindrothella (Erwin & Kavanaugh, 1981)
 Lionepha lummi (Erwin & Kavanaugh, 1981)
Additionally, many species were formerly placed in the genus Bembidion, but later moved to Lionepha on the basis of genetic evidence.

References

Further reading

 

Trechinae
Articles created by Qbugbot